Local elections were held in Norway, with the exception of six municipalities, on October 20, 1947.

Result of municipal elections
Results of the 1947 municipal elections.

References

Local elections in Norway
1940s elections in Norway
Norway
Local